Auswärtsspiel (Away game) is the ninth studio album by the German punk band Die Toten Hosen. It was released in 2002. This is one of the band's favourite albums. The record is much more personal than previous albums. This is also the last album re-released remastered in digipak, with a new booklet and with bonus tracks along with all the previous major albums in 2007.

Track listing
 "Du lebst nur einmal (vorher)" (You only live once (before)) (Breitkopf/Frege) − 2:09
 "Schlampe (nachher)" (Bitch (afterwards)) (Frege/Frege, Rocko Schamoni) − 3:01
 "Was zählt" (What counts) (Breitkopf, von Holst/Frege) − 4:37
 "Auswärtsspiel" (Away game) (Frege/Frege) − 2:35
 "Cokane in My Brain" (Bullocks/Bullocks) − 3:22 (Dillinger cover)
 "Graue Panther" (Gray panthers) (Meurer/Frege) − 2:52
 "Tier" (Animal) (Meurer/Frege) − 1:14
 "Kanzler sein..." (To be the chancellor...) (Breitkopf, Meurer, Funny van Dannen/Frege, van Dannen) − 3:26
 "Das Mädchen aus Rottweil" (The girl from Rottweil) (Frege, von Holst/Meurer, Frege) − 3:18
 "Dankbar" (Grateful) (Breitkopf, von Holst/Frege) − 2:53
 "Nur zu Besuch" (Just visiting) (Frege, von Holst/Frege) − 4:29
 "Daydreaming" (Breitkopf, T. V. Smith, Frege, von Holst/Frege, Smith) − 3:10
 "Steh auf, wenn du am Boden bist" (Stand up, when you're on the floor) (von Holst/Frege) − 3:51
 "Amanita phalloides" (Breitkopf/Frege) − 2:27
 "Depression Deluxe" (von Holst/Frege) − 3:09
 "Schwimmen" (Swimming) (Frege, von Holst/Frege) − 3:33
 "Venceremos - Wir werden siegen" (We will win [in Spanish and in German]) (Meurer/Frege) − 3:26
 "Kein Alkohol (ist auch keine Lösung)!" (No alcohol (is no solution either)!) (Frege, Meurer, van Dannen/Frege, van Dannen) − 3:49

2007 remastered anniversary edition bonus tracks
<li> "Drüber reden" (Talking about it) (von Holst/Frege) – 1:42 (from "Was zählt")
<li> "Schöner warten" (Nicer waiting) (Frege/Frege) – 3:58 (from "Was zählt")
<li> "Im Meer" (In the sea) (Breitkopf, von Holst/Frege) – 3:42 (from "Kein Alkohol (ist auch keine Lösung)!")
<li> "Leben im Bildausschnitt" (Life in a picture detail) (Meurer/Frege) – 3:05 (from "Steh auf, wenn du am Boden bist")
<li> "Hirnfick (Futter für die Fische)" (Brainfuck (Food for the fish)) (von Holst/Frege) – 3:17 (from "Nur zu Besuch")
 "Das Leben ist schwer, wenn man dumm ist" (Life is hard, when one's dumb) (von Holst/Frege) – 3:39 (Zurück zum Glück demo)

Singles
2001: "Was zählt"
2002: "Kein Alkohol (ist auch keine Lösung)!"
2002: "Steh auf, wenn du am Boden bist"
2002: "Nur zu Besuch"

Personnel
Campino - vocals
Andreas von Holst - guitar
Michael Breitkopf - guitar
Andreas Meurer - bass
Vom Ritchie - drums
Tim Cross - keyboards
Hans Steingen - piano on 11

Charts

Weekly charts

Year-end charts

References 

Die Toten Hosen albums
2002 albums
German-language albums